Amos Elkana (born August 20, 1967) is an Israeli composer and improviser.

Life 
Amos Elkana is a multi-award-winning composer, guitarist and electronic musician. In their decision to award him the Prime Minister's Prize for Music Composition the jury noted that Elkana is the author of "very original music, independent of the prevailing fashion, guided by unique and delicate taste," and radiates "a strong sense of honesty."

Amos was born in Boston, USA in 1967 but grew up in Jerusalem. His father was historian and philosopher of science Yehuda Elkana. Amos began playing guitar and studying music at age 15. He returned to Boston to study jazz guitar at the Berklee College of Music and Composition at the New England Conservatory of Music. His primary composition teacher at NEC was William Thomas McKinley.
Later on he moved to Paris where he took composition lessons with Michele Reverdy and additional lessons with Erik Norby in Copenhagen and with Paul-Heinz Dittrich and Edison Denisov in Berlin.
Elkana continued his studies at Bard College, New York City where he earned an MFA in Music and Sound.  At Bard he focused on electronic music and took lessons with Pauline Oliveros, David Behrman, Richard Teitelbaum, George Lewis, Maryanne Amacher, Larry Polansky and more.

In 1993 Elkana had his Carnegie Hall debut with "Saxophone Quartet No.1" composed for the Berlin Saxophone Quartet. In 1994 Elkana composed "Tru’a", a concerto for clarinet and orchestra, that was recorded by Richard Stoltzman and the Warsaw Philharmonic Orchestra. Tru’a was premiered in Israel by Gilad Harel and The Jerusalem Symphony Orchestra under Frédéric Chaslin and in Taiwan by the TNUA orchestra.

"Arabic Lessons", a tri-lingual song-cycle in Arabic, Hebrew and German to the words of Michael Roes, was composed in 97-98 and premiered in the Berlin Festival in 1998. For this work Elkana received the Golden Feather Award from ACUM. In its review of Arabic Lessons, the Jerusalem Post called it "a perplexing, beguiling 40-minute opus in which the composer challenges the so-called 'acceptable' form of the lieder, shattering it and building it anew, as if constructing a new world from its ashes. ...Arabic Lessons is one of the most significant works composed in Israel for quite a while."

In 2006 Elkana composed "Eight Flowers" for solo piano in honor of György Kurtág’s 80th birthday. The work was premiered that same year in Schloss Neuhardenberg near Berlin during a festival celebrating Kurtág and in his presence. Since then this work has been performed all over the world including the ISCM World Music Days in Sweden in 2009.

Elkana’s short opera "The Journey Home" comments on the Israeli-Palestinian conflict by telling the true and incredibly touching story of a Palestinian man who lived in this troubled land during most of the 20th century. The opera was commissioned by opus21musicPlus and premiered in the Gasteig Auditorium in Munich in 2013.

In 2013-2014 Elkana was invited to be a fellow for a year at the International Research Center »Interweaving Performance Cultures« in Berlin where he worked on his next opera "Nathan the Wise". This fascinating project brings Lessing's play to life as a tri-lingual opera. The original text was edited into a libretto in Hebrew, German and Arabic by Elkana's long time collaborator Michael Roes while preserving Lessing's unique poetic language.

Elkana's new Piano Concerto “…with purity and light…” (2015) was commissioned by the Israel Symphony Orchestra and premiered on July 21, 2016.

"Casino Umbro" is the title of Elkana's recent CD released to great critical acclaim on the American label Ravello in 2012. The CD includes four compositions: Casino Umbro, String Quartet No.2, Arabic Lessons and Tru'a. It was reviewed by Frank J. Oteri on New music box.

Apart from concert music, Elkana composes regularly for dance and theater. He frequently works with director/choreographer Sommer Ulrickson and Artist/Stage designer Alexander Polzin. This team produced several works which were staged in the US, Germany and Israel. Among them "After Hamlet" which is a dance/theater piece that takes an original twist on Shakespear's Hamlet, "Never Mind" which deals with the Capgras syndrome, "Remains" and "Zwischenspiel".

Elkana is an expert of the open-source program "Pure Data" and he teaches it and electronic music in general as well as composition. In the past he taught at UC Santa Cruz and gave lectures on his music at the Munich Academy of Music and Theater, Academia de Muzică "Gheorghe Dima” in Cluj-Napoca, the Jerusalem Academy of Music and Dance and the Buchmann-Mehta School of Music among others.

Elkana is also an active performer. He regularly participates in concerts and performances of improvised music where he plays the electric guitar and the computer. In 2010 he opened the International Literature Festival in Berlin giving a concert of his music for Recorded voices of poets, Electric guitar and electronics.

Selected works 
Tripp (2016) - Quintet
 ... with purity and light ... (2015) - Piano concerto
Reflections (2014) - Violin and electronics
The Journey Home (2013) - Opera
Casino Umbro (2010) - Sextet
Whither do you go home (2009) - Cello and electronics
Shivers (2008) - Celesta solo
Prague 1588 (2008) - Clarinet solo
Hommage à György Ligeti (2007) - Chamber orchestra
Eight Flowers A bouquet for György Kurtág (2006) - Piano solo
Plexure (2005) - Duo
String Quartet No. 2 (2004)
Arabic Lessons a song-cycle (1998) - for 3 Sopranos and chamber ensemble
Ru'ach Quintet (1996) - Quintet
Revadim (1995) - Quintet
Tru'a (1994) - Clarinet concerto
Shir (1991) - Flute solo

Discography
"Tripp" (Albany, 2018)
"Casino Umbro" (Ravello, 2012)
Works 1992-1996 (1996)
Works (2005)
Live Concert DVD (2008)

References 

https://bachtrack.com/interview-composer-amos-elkana-january-2017
http://www.newmusicbox.org/articles/sounds-heard-amos-elkana-casino-umbro/
http://www.geisteswissenschaften.fu-berlin.de/en/v/interweaving-performance-cultures/fellows/fellows_2013_2014/amos_elkana/index.html
http://www.ravellorecords.com/catalog/rr7863/
https://web.archive.org/web/20110721120509/http://www.civitella.org/fellows_personal.aspx?fellowid=482
http://www.israelcomposers.org/Members.aspx?lang=English&letter=E&id=269|title=Amos Elkana|publisher=Israel Composers' League|accessdate=4 February 2010
https://web.archive.org/web/20151129054247/http://imi.org.il/composer_page.php?name=38
http://barlow.byu.edu/commission-recipients/
http://www.literaturfestival.com/participants/musicians/amos-elkana
http://musrara.org/index.php?option=com_content&view=article&id=670&Itemid=1104
http://www.rimonschool.co.il/team/elkana-amos/
http://www.jamd.ac.il/content/%D7%A4%D7%95%D7%A8%D7%95%D7%9D-%D7%A8%D7%91-%D7%AA%D7%97%D7%95%D7%9E%D7%99-%D7%A2%D7%9D-%D7%A2%D7%9E%D7%95%D7%A1-%D7%90%D7%9C%D7%A7%D7%A0%D7%94
http://opusmagazine.co.il/report/iso-review-july-2016/
http://www.tokafi.com/15questions/15-questions-to-amos-elkana/
http://www.sequenza21.com/2010/06/concoct-sonance/
https://web.archive.org/web/20110928074623/http://www.amc.net/AmosElkana

External links
Amos Elkana's web page

1967 births
20th-century classical composers
21st-century classical composers
Living people
Israeli male composers
Israeli guitarists
Musicians from Tel Aviv
Male classical composers
20th-century guitarists
21st-century guitarists
20th-century Israeli male musicians
21st-century Israeli male musicians